Bolotești is a commune located in Vrancea County, Romania. It is composed of six villages: Bolotești, Găgești, Ivăncești, Pietroasa, Putna and Vităneștii de sub Măgură.

Natives
 Ion Cristoiu

References

Communes in Vrancea County
Localities in Western Moldavia